Tigrioides puncticollis is a moth in the family Erebidae. It was described by Arthur Gardiner Butler in 1877. It is found on Borneo, Java, Bali and Lombok. The habitat consists of lower montane forests and lowland forests.

The ground colour of the forewings is straw with blackish patches on the dorsum.

The larvae feed on mosses. They are short, dark and very hairy.

References

Arctiidae genus list at Butterflies and Moths of the World of the Natural History Museum

Moths described in 1877
Lithosiina